This is a list of cricketers who have played first-class, List A or Twenty20 cricket for Puducherry cricket team.

Seasons given are first and last seasons; the player did not necessarily play in all the intervening seasons. Players in bold have played international cricket.

A
Fabid Ahmed, 2018-present
A Aravinddaraj, 2018-present
Sridhar Ashwath, 2021-present
Subramanian Anand, 2019-21

B
Suboth Bhati, 2021-present

C
Magendiran Chinnadurai, 2018-19
Saju Chothan, 2018-19

D
Paras Dogra, 2018-present
Pavan Deshpande, 2020-present

G
Prabhakaran Gopalakrishnan, 2018-19
AS Govindaraajan, 2018-present
Raiphi Gomez, 2018-19

J
Akshay Jain, 2018-19
Satish Jangir, 2018-19
Sheldon Jackson (cricketer), 2020-21

K
Sai Karthik (cricketer), 2018-present
Sukumaran Karthik, 2018-present
Pawan Kumar (cricketer, born 1989), 2018-19
Sashi Kumar (cricketer), 2018-19
Santhosh Kumaran, 2018-19
Selvam Suresh Kumar
Arun Karthik, 2019-20
Vinay Kumar, 2019-20

M
Jayaprakash Manikandan, 2021-present
Madhavan Manohar, 2018-19
Vikneshwaran Marimuthu, 2018-present
Santha Moorthy, 2019-20

N
Iqlas Naha, 2018-present
Angadu Narayanan, 2018-19
Abhishek Nayar, 2018-19

P
Alagh Prathiban, 2020-present
Manogaran Pooviarasan, 2021-present
Logesh Prabagaran, 2021-present

R
Ramachandran Ragupathy, 2019-20
Premraj Rajavelu, 2021-present
Ashith Rajiv, 2018-present
Baskaran Ranjit, 2018-19
Damodaren Rohit, 2018-present

S
Abhijeet Saranath, 2018-19
Pratik Sargade, 2018-19
Thalaivan Sargunam, 2018-19
Raghu Sharma, 2021-present
Pankaj Singh (cricketer), 2018-present
Shashank Singh, 2018-19
Anton Subikshan, 2021-present
Nikhilesh Surendran, 2018-19
Bharat Sharma, 2021-present

T
Parandaman Thamaraikannan, 2018-present
Saiju Titus, 2018-19
Sagar Trivedi, 2018-present

U
Sagar Udeshi, 2018-present

V
Prashanth Varma, 2018-19
Vengadeshwaran, 2018-19
Kannan Vignesh, 2020-21

External links

Puducherry cricketers